Liolaemus quilmes is a species of lizard in the family  Liolaemidae. It is native to Argentina.

References

quilmes
Reptiles described in 1993
Reptiles of Argentina
Endemic fauna of Argentina
Taxa named by Richard Emmett Etheridge